The 2015–16 SMU Mustangs men's basketball team represented Southern Methodist University (SMU) during the 2015–16 NCAA Division I men's basketball season. The Mustangs were led by fourth year head coach Larry Brown and played their home games on their campus in University Park, Texas at Moody Coliseum. They were members of the American Athletic Conference. The Mustangs finished the season with a record of 25–5, 13–5 in AAC play to finish in second place in conference.

Due to multiple violations, including academic fraud and unethical conduct, SMU was ineligible for all postseason play including the AAC tournament and NCAA tournament. Additionally, head coach Larry Brown was suspended for nine games.

Previous season
The Mustangs finished the 2014–15 season with a record of 27–7, 15–3 in AAC play to win the AAC regular season championship. They defeated East Carolina, Temple, and UConn to win the AAC tournament. They received the conference's automatic bid to the NCAA tournament as a #6 seed where they lost on a controversial goaltending call in the Second round to UCLA.

Departures

Incoming Transfers

2015 recruiting class

Roster

Schedule

SMU has been invited to play in the Las Vegas Classic, where they will play against two the following three teams: Colorado, Penn State, Kent State. Two on-campus games will precede the Las Vegas-hosted games. The Mustangs will host Gonzaga, Michigan, Brown, and Yale. SMU will also play true road games at Stanford and TCU.

SMU's American Athletic Conference schedule will include home-and-home matchups with Cincinnati, UConn, East Carolina, Houston, Memphis, USF, Tulane, and Tulsa. The Mustangs will also host UCF and play a true road game at Temple during its conference schedule.

|-
!colspan=12 style=""| Regular season

Rankings

SMU is ineligible to be ranked in the Coaches poll due to sanctions stemming from academic fraud and unethical conduct.

Midseason recognition
On February 1, 2016, Nic Moore was named one of 10 finalists for the Bob Cousy Point Guard of the Year Award. He was named to the 35-man midseason watchlist for the Naismith Trophy on February 11.

References

SMU Mustangs men's basketball seasons
Smu